Thomas Bonham may refer to:
Thomas Bonham (died 1420), MP for Wiltshire
Thomas Bonham (died 1532), MP for Essex
Thomas Bonham (physician) (1564–c. 1628), English physician